Mihaljevići may refer to:
Mihaljevići (Bratunac), a village in Bratunac municipality, Bosnia and Herzegovina
Mihaljevići (Busovača), a village in Busovača municipality, Bosnia and Herzegovina
Mihaljevići, Požega-Slavonia County, a village in Požega-Slavonia County, Croatia
  Mihaljevići, Ceklin; Crna Gora, Montenegro